The Gentleman from Arizona is a 1939 American Western film directed by Earl Haley and written by Earl Haley and Jack O'Donnell. The film stars John 'Dusty' King, J. Farrell MacDonald, Joan Barclay, Ruth Reece, Craig Reynolds and Nora Lane. The film was released on December 25, 1939, by Monogram Pictures.

Plot

Cast          
John 'Dusty' King as Pokey Sanders 
J. Farrell MacDonald as Wild Bill Coburn
Joan Barclay as Georgia Coburn
Ruth Reece as Juanita Coburn
Craig Reynolds as 'Van' Van Wyck
Nora Lane as Martha
Doc Pardee as Doc Pardee 
Ross Santee as Ross 
Adrianna Galvez as Senorita Adrianna
Johnnie Morris as Pee Wee 
Sherry Hall as The Gimp

References

External links
 

1939 films
American Western (genre) films
1939 Western (genre) films
Monogram Pictures films
1930s English-language films
1930s American films